Gaasinather Gangaser Ponnambalam (: 12 August 1938 – 5 January 2000; known as Kumar Ponnambalam) was a Sri Lankan lawyer and politician. Leader of the All Ceylon Tamil Congress, he was a presidential candidate in 1982. He was shot dead in January 2000 in an assassination many suspect to be ordered by President Chandrika Kumaratunga.

Early life and family
Ponnambalam was born on 12 August 1938. He was the son of G. G. Ponnambalam, a leading Tamil politician and lawyer, and Rose Alagumani Clough. He was educated at St. Patrick's College, Jaffna and Royal College, Colombo. After school he studied at Aquinas University College, Colombo before joining King's College London, graduating with a LL.B. degree. He then proceeded to the University of Cambridge, graduating with a MA degree. He was a contemporary of leftist politician Vikramabahu Karunaratne at Cambridge.

Ponnambalam married Yogalakshmi, a surgeon and eldest daughter of T. Murugesapillai, a former Additional Government Agent for Jaffna. They had a daughter (Mirinalini, a doctor) and a son (Gajendrakumar, lawyer and politician).

Career

Law
Ponnambalam was called to the bar at Lincoln's Inn in 1974. Returning to Ceylon, he started practising law as an advocate. He was a successful lawyer and became very rich as a result. He learned Sinhala so he could argue his cases in that language.

Ponnambalam became involved in human rights activism in the 1970s and co-founded the Civil Rights Movement. He would represent pro bono Sinhalese youths who had been victims of human rights abuses. He opposed the Criminal Justice Commission as it violated the rule of law and the right to a fair trial and two parallel systems of justice. He also opposed the 1982 referendum on extending the life of Parliament by six years. He addressed the United Nations Commission on Human Rights in Geneva in 1997 and 1999 and the European Parliament in 1998 on the grievances of Sri Lanka's Tamil population. He was involved in the Krishanti Kumaraswamy case and was instrumental in bringing attention to the Chemmani mass graves. He was noted for his appearances, pro bono, on behalf of Tamil youth detained by the state under the Prevention of Terrorism Act and emergency regulations. He even took on unpopular work such as defending those accused of the Central Bank bombing.

Politics
Ponnambalam joined his father's All Ceylon Tamil Congress (ACTC) in the 1960s and became president of its youth wing in 1966. On 14 May 1972 the ACTC, Illankai Tamil Arasu Kachchi, Ceylon Workers' Congress, Eelath Thamilar Otrumai Munnani and All Ceylon Tamil Conference formed the Tamil United Front, later renamed Tamil United Liberation Front (TULF). The TULF failed to select Ponnambalam as one of its candidates for the 1977 parliamentary election. As a result, Ponnambalam stood as an independent candidate in Jaffna but was defeated by the TULF candidate V. Yogeswaran.

In 1978 Ponnambalam re-registered the ACTC as a separate political party. The ACTC contested elections thereafter but with little success. Ponnambalam was the ACTC's candidate at the 1982 presidential election. He came fourth after receiving 173,934 votes (2.67%) though he did come first in Jaffna District, the heartland of the Sri Lankan Tamil population. Ponnambalam was one of the ACTC's candidates in Jaffna District at the 1989 parliamentary election but the ACTC failed to win any seats in Parliament.

Initially Ponnambalam did not support the separatist agenda espoused by Sri Lankan Tamil militant groups and worked closely with the Sinhalese politicians, co-authoring Sirimavo Bandaranaike's manifesto in 1988. But as the Sri Lankan Civil War progressed he grew disillusioned and distrustful of Sinhalese politicians and took a more nationalistic stance. Ponnambalam contested the 1994 parliamentary election as part of an independent group in Colombo District but the group failed to win any seats in Parliament. Thereafter Ponnambalam became more radical, a vociferous supporter of the militant Liberation Tigers of Tamil Eelam (LTTE) and an ardent critic of the Sri Lankan government and moderate Tamil political parties such as the TULF whom he branded "quislings" and  "collaborators". Ponnambalam travelled the world to promote the LTTE and its cause.

Ponnambalam was very critical of President Chandrika Kumaratunga and tried unsuccessfully to field a Tamil candidate against Kumaratunga at the 1999 presidential election. The day after the presidential election Kumaratunga gave a victory speech in which she warned LTTE supporters living in the south (the Sinhalese areas) to be aware. A few days later Ponnambalam wrote an open letter to Kumaratunga saying that he was "an unalloyed, unrepentant supporter of the political philosophy of the LTTE", condemning "the naked threats that dot[ted] [Kumaratunga's victory] speech" and concluding that "a political solution to the Tamil Problem is in the hands of the Tamils themselves and only in their hands and that the Sinhalese and Tamils can continue to live in this island and in peace only if they live in two definite and distinct compartments each minding their own business unfettered by the other". The letter is regarded as an epitaph to Ponnambalam's commitment to the struggle achieve equality and freedom for Sri Lanka's Tamils.

Assassination
On the morning of 5 January 2000, around 9.05 am, a female suicide bomber blew herself up in front of the Prime Minister's Office on Sir Ernest de Silva Mawatha (Flower Road) in Colombo, killing 13 and injuring 29. Afterwards there was tension in Colombo as Tamils feared reprisals. Ponnambalam had been planning to view a Mercedes-Benz car with his son but on hearing about the suicide bombing they stayed at home. At around 10 am a man called "Shantha", who spoke fluent Sinhala, arrived at Ponnambalam's house, Gitanjali, on Queens Road in Colombo, and was shown inside. Ponnambalam and Shantha spoke for about thirty minutes before the pair left in one of Ponnambalam's Mercedes-Benz. Ponnambalam dispensed with his chauffeur and drove himself whilst Shantha sat in the front passenger seat. Ponnambalam told his servants that he was going out but didn't say where he was going. Ponnambalam seemed comfortable with Shantha but had removed his watch, gold chain and other jewellery before leaving.

About an hour later passers-by found Ponnambalam's car parked at Ramakrishna Terrace in Wellawatte with Ponnambalam slouched in the driver's seat. He had been shot twice, once in the head and once in the chest, at close range. The driver's window had been lowered and it is believed that it was through this that the killer(s) shot Ponnambalam. The gun used to kill Ponnambalam is believed to be a Browning 9 mm and is presumed to have had a silencer as no one in the neighbourhood heard any shots. There was no sign of Shantha though according to the police another person had been sitting in the rear seats of the car. According to Ponnambalam's family Shantha had been speaking to Ponnambalam on the phone since November 1999. Ponnambalam had told his family that he was discussing a case with Shantha.

Ponnambalam was assassinated in the same area as MP and newspaper publisher Nadarajah Atputharajah (alias Ramesh) was assassinated in November 1999. Atputharajah assassination was blamed on the Eelam People's Democratic Party, a government backed paramilitary group. An unknown group calling itself National Movement Against Tigers claimed responsibility for Ponnambalam's assassination and threatened to kill others who helped the LTTE, directly or indirectly. It is widely believed that the assassination was sanctioned by Kumaratunga.

According to The Sunday Leader Ponnambalam's killing was organised by Baddegana Sanjeewa, a member of Kumaratunga's Presidential Security Division. Acting on Sanjeewa's instructions Reserve Police Constable Sugath Ranasinghe, posing as Shantha, became friendly with Ponnambalam. On the day of the killing Shantha lured Ponnambalam to Wellawatte where gangsters M. A. Kalinga (alias Moratu Saman) and Tharawatte Ajith (alias Sujeewa) were waiting to kill Ponnambalam. After the killing, the killers are alleged to have gone to the office of a deputy minister and shown the murder weapon, which belonged to Mahendra Ratwatte, Kumaratunga's second cousin and son of a deputy defence minister Anuruddha Ratwatte, and Ponnambalam's mobile phone as proof. According to The Sunday Leader Kumaratunga tried to protect Ponnambalam's killers after the assassination.<ref>{{cite news|title='Shows nuclear bombshell|url=http://www.thesundayleader.lk/archive/20011230/spotlight.htm|work=The Sunday Leader|date=30 December 2001}}</ref> In February 2002 The Sunday Leader published a transcript of a telephone conversation between Ranasinghe and OIC Nuwan Wedasinghe of the Criminal Detective Bureau (CDB) which further implicates Mahendra Ratwatte in Ponnambalam's killing. The Sunday Leader has claimed that it has received a sworn affidavit from CDB director SSP Bandula Wickremasinghe that Mahendra Ratwatte was involved in Ponnambalam's killing.

Ranasinghe, Moratu Saman and Sujeewa were eventually arrested by the police after which Ranasinghe implicated in Mahendra Ratwatte in Ponnambalam's killing. According to the police the three detainees had confessed to killing Ponnambalam and Satana'' editor Rohana Kumara on a contract from a private party/patriotic group. Sanjeewa was shot dead on 2 November 2001, allegedly by Dhammika Perera, a member of the Sri Lankan mafia. His body was found slumped in the driver's seat of his Nissan Serena, with six shots in Pagoda Road, Colombo. Notorious gangster Moratu Saman was shot dead on 18 May 2003 in Moratuwa by gangster Thoppi Chaminda. Ranasinghe was shot dead on 20 August 2003 in Moratuwa as he returning from Moratuwa Magistrates's court in a rickshaw.

On 8 January 2000 the LTTE conferred the title Maamanithar (great human being) on Ponnambalam. His funeral was held on 9 January 2000 at Kannate Hindu cemetery.

Ponnambalam was one of Colombo's wealthiest residents, owning a fleet of Mercedes-Benz cars. Following his death his sister Vijayalakshmi got into legal disputes with his widow and children over ownership of property and companies in the United States and Singapore.

No one had been brought to justice for Ponnambalam's killing.

Electoral history

References

External links
 

1938 births
2000 deaths
All Ceylon Tamil Congress politicians
Alumni of King's College London
Alumni of St. Patrick's College, Jaffna
Alumni of Royal College, Colombo
Alumni of the University of Cambridge
Assassinated Sri Lankan activists
Assassinated Sri Lankan politicians
Ceylonese advocates
Maamanithar
Members of Lincoln's Inn
People from Colombo
People killed during the Sri Lankan Civil War
People from British Ceylon
Kumar
Sri Lankan Hindus
Candidates in the 1982 Sri Lankan presidential election
Sri Lankan Tamil activists
Sri Lankan Tamil lawyers
Sri Lankan Tamil politicians
Sri Lankan terrorism victims
Terrorism deaths in Sri Lanka